Jean-Joseph Balechou (Arles, 11 July 1715 - Avignon, 18 August 1765) was a French engraver.

Works 
 Portrait of Augustus, king of Poland after Hyacinthe Rigaud
 Portrait of Dom Philippe, infant of Spain after Louis René Vialy
 Portrait of Charles Rollin after Charles Antoine Coypel
 Portrait of Gabriel Grillot, abbé de Pontigny after Louis Autreau
 Portrait of Heinrich von Brühl after Louis de Silvestre
 Portrait of Jean Varin after Claude Lefebvre
 Portrait of Louise-Elisabeth of France, infante of Parma after Jean-Marc Nattier
 The Bathers
 The Calm
 The Tempest, after Claude Joseph Vernet
 Sainte-Geneviève, after Charles Amédée Philippe van Loo

Gallery 

1715 births
1765 deaths
18th-century engravers
French engravers